William Herman Potstock (Wilhelm Hermann), (1872–1941) was a German American musician and composer. His best known work “Souvenir De Sarasate ” combines different techniques (left-hand pizzicato and double stops) and is a popular virtuoso piece.

Life 
Potstock was born in Northern Germany; he emigrated with his family via Bremen (Germany) to the U.S. in 1881. He lived and worked as a self-employed music teacher and musician in Chicago, where he died. In 1895 he married Martha Bock. They had two children, Stella (born 1896) and Eugene (1901–1979). His daughter was also an accomplished musician just like her father.

List of compositions 
 Souvenir de Sarasate: Fantasia Espagnole für Violine und Klavier in D-Dur, Op. 15

References 
 The National Archives, Germans to America Passenger Data File, 1850 – 1897
 1920 and 1930 U.S. census data, section Cook County, Chicago.

1872 births
1941 deaths
19th-century American composers
19th-century classical composers
19th-century Danish composers
19th-century American male musicians
20th-century American composers
20th-century classical composers
20th-century Danish composers
20th-century American male musicians
American male classical composers
American Romantic composers
Composers for violin
German male classical composers
German Romantic composers